Owen Belmont Campbell (18 January 1918 – 7 August 1993) was an Australian rugby league footballer who played in the 1930s and 1940s. He was a winger who played with three different Sydney clubs during his career and won the 1941 premiership with St George.

Playing career
'Ossie' Campbell featured in seven NSWRFL seasons. Originally from Maitland, New South Wales, he started his career at Newtown in 1938, then moved to Eastern Suburbs for one season in 1940 and then moved to St George for five seasons between 1941 and 1945. He won a premiership when he scored two tries for St George in 1941 Grand Final. He retired at the end of 1945.

Campbell died on 7 August 1993, aged 75.

Published sources
 Whiticker, Alan & Hudson, Glen (2006) The Encyclopedia of Rugby League Players, Gavin Allen Publishing, Sydney
 Haddan, Steve (2007) The Finals – 100 Years of National Rugby League Finals, Steve Haddan Publishing, Brisbane

References

1918 births
1993 deaths
St. George Dragons players
Sydney Roosters players
Newtown Jets players
Australian rugby league players
Country New South Wales rugby league team players
Rugby league wingers
Rugby league players from New South Wales